Shahrak Emam Khomeyni (also Romanized as Shahrak Emām Khomeynī) is a village in Qaleh Rural District, in the Central District of Manujan County, Kerman Province, Iran. At the 2006 census, its population was 912, in 189 families.

References 

Populated places in Manujan County